John M. Oldham is an American psychiatrist who is a distinguished emeritus professor at the Baylor College of Medicine.

Education 
He received as Bachelor of science degree from Duke University, a Master of Science in Engineering and a Master of Medicine in neuroendocrinology from the Baylor College of Medicine. He also worked as an intern at the Icahn School of Medicine at Mount Sinai and received his postgraduate training at Columbia University and the New York Presbyterian Hospital. John would also receive psychoanalytic training at the Columbia Psychoanalytic Center. Oldham also has a diploma in psychiatry and forensic psychiatry.

Positions 
He is a member of the American College of Psychiatrists, American Psychiatric Association, Benjamin Rush Society, International Society for the Study of Personality Disorders, and he is a fellow of the Royal College of Physicians of Edinburgh. John Oldham was also the Chief of Staff and Senior Vice President of the Menninger Foundation and a former president of the APA, ACP, and the Association for Research on Personality Disorders. He headed the New York State Office of Mental Health and was and executive director and a chairman of the department of psychiatry and behavioral sciences at the Institute of Psychiatry in the Medical University of Charleston. Today, Oldham serves as the treasurer of the American College of Psychiatrists, the president of the South Carolina Psychiatric Association, he represents the American Psychiatric Association in the American Medical Association, and he works as the distinguished emeritus professor at the Menninger Department of Psychiatry and Behavioral Sciences in the Baylor College of Medicine

Research 
He, along with Lois B. Morris developed the NPSP25. Oldham also studies personality disorders, and works as a psychiatrist seeking patients with Anorexia, anxiety, bipolar disorder, binge eating disorder, ADHD, AVPD, BDD, and ASPD. Oldham has published over 200 journal articles and books on these subjects and is internationally recognized as a leading figure in the psychiatric community. He is the editor of the Journal of Psychiatric Practice, the Joint Editor of Journal of Personality Disorders, and the Joint Editor-in-Chief of Borderline Personality Disorder and Emotion Dysregulation.

References 

21st-century American physicians
20th-century American physicians
American psychiatrists
Year of birth missing (living people)
Living people
Duke University alumni
Fellows of the Royal College of Physicians of Edinburgh
Baylor College of Medicine faculty
Baylor College of Medicine alumni